Pushpa Kamal Dahal (born Ghanashyam Dahal, 11 December 1954), alias Prachanda (meaning "fierce"), is a Nepalese politician currently serving as the Prime Minister of Nepal. He previously held the prime ministerial post from 2008 to 2009 as the first prime minister of the Federal Democratic Republic of Nepal, and again from 2016 to 2017.

Dahal was born in Pokhara, and spent most of his childhood in Chitwan, where he received a diploma of science in agriculture from Institute of Agriculture and Animal Science (IAAS) in Rampur, Chitwan. He joined left-wing political parties after seeing severe poverty in his youth. In 1981, he joined the Communist Party of Nepal (Fourth Convention), and later became general secretary of the Communist Party of Nepal (Mashal) in 1989. This party later became the Communist Party of Nepal (Maoist). Dahal was the leader of the Communist Party of Nepal (Maoist) during the country's civil war and subsequent peace process and the 1st Nepalese constituent assembly. In the 2008 elections, CPN(M) emerged as the largest party, and Dahal became Prime Minister in August of that year. He resigned from the post on 4 May 2009, after his attempt to sack the then army chief, General Rookmangud Katawal, was opposed by then President Ram Baran Yadav.

Dahal was sworn in as Prime Minister for the second time in 2016, as per an agreement to form a rotational government by Congress and CPN (Maoist Centre). He resigned from the post of Prime Minister on 24 May 2017. Following the 2022 Nepalese general election, with an alliance with political parties including CPN (UML), Rastriya Swatantra Party and Rastriya Prajatantra Party, Dahal was sworn in as Prime Minister once again in 2022.

Early life
He was born Ghanashyam Dahal on 11 December 1954 in Pokhara, to Muktiram and Bhawani, a Brahmin Hindu family. He later changed his name during a matriculation examination to Pushpa Kamal (meaning: Lotus Flower). At the age of eight, his family migrated to Terai, a fertile lowland region in southern Nepal, and settled in Chitwan District. In the 1950s, his father Muktiram moved to Indian state of Assam, where he worked as a firewood collector, and returned home in 1961. In 1971, Pushpa Kamal Dahal moved to Kathmandu for his studies, and was enrolled in Patan Multiple Campus for two years. He moved back to Chitwan and received a diploma of science in agriculture from Institute of Agriculture and Animal Science (IAAS) in Rampur, Chitwan. After completing studies and failing to find jobs in bureaucracy, Dahal became a school teacher in a village, where he worked until 1979.

Dahal became drawn to left-wing political parties after seeing severe poverty in his youth. He joined the Communist Party of Nepal (Fourth Convention) in 1981. He became general secretary of the Communist Party of Nepal (Mashal) in 1989, this party, later, became the Communist Party of Nepal (Maoist). Dahal was underground, even after the restoration of democracy in 1990. Not yet widely known, he controlled the clandestine wing of the party, while Baburam Bhattarai represented the United People's Front in parliament.

Nepalese Civil War

On 4 February 1996, Baburam Bhattarai gave the government, led by Nepali Congress Prime Minister Sher Bahadur Deuba, a list of 40 demands, threatening civil war if they were not met. The demands related to "nationalism, democracy, and livelihood" and included such line items as the "domination of foreign capital in Nepali industries, business and finance should be stopped", and "discriminatory treaties, including the 1950 Nepal-India Treaty, should be abrogated", and "land under the control of the feudal system should be confiscated and distributed to the landless and the homeless." After that, and until 26 April 2006, Dahal directed the military efforts of the CPN (Maoist Centre) towards establishing areas of control, particularly in the mountainous regions and in western Nepal. The 40 demands were whittled down to 24 in subsequent political negotiations.
In late 2004 or early 2005, relations between Dahal and Baburam Bhattarai soured. This was reportedly due to disagreement on power-sharing inside the party. Bhattarai was unhappy with the consolidation of power under Dahal. At one point, Dahal expelled Bhattarai from the party, though he was later reinstated. They later reconciled at least some of their differences. On 22 November 2005, Dahal and the Seven Party Alliance released a 'twelve-point agreement' that expressed areas of agreement between the CPN(M) and the parties that had won a large majority in the last parliamentary election in 1999. Among other points, this document stated that the dictatorial monarchy of King Gyanendra was the chief impediment to progress in Nepal. It claimed further that the Maoists were committed to human rights and press freedoms and a multi-party system of government. It pledged self-criticism and the intention of the Maoists and the Seven Parties to not repeat past mistakes.

On 26 April 2006, CPN (Maoist Centre) announced a ceasefire with a stated duration of 90 days. The move followed weeks of massive protests—the April 2006 Nepalese general strike— in Kathmandu and elsewhere that had forced King Gyanendra to give up the personal dictatorship he had established on 1 February 2005, and restore the parliament that had been dissolved in May 2002. A new government was then established by the Seven-Party Alliance. The parliament and the new government supported the ceasefire and started negotiations with the Maoists on the basis of the twelve-point agreement. The two sides agreed that a new constituent assembly would be elected to write a new constitution, and decide the fate of the monarchy. The Maoists wanted this process to end with Nepal becoming declared as a republic.

Premierships

First premiership 

Dahal met for talks with Prime Minister Girija Prasad Koirala on 16 June 2006, which was thought to be his first visit to the capital Kathmandu in more than a decade. This meeting resulted in the Comprehensive Peace Accord to dissolve parliament, incorporate the CPN(M) into a new interim government, draft a new constitution, and disband the CPN(M)'s "people's governments" operating in rural Nepal. The two sides also agreed to disarm at a later date, under international supervision. On 18 September 2007, the CPN(M) left the coalition government ahead of the Constituent Assembly election, demanding the declaration of a republic by parliament, and a system of proportional representation in the election. The CPN(M) rejoined the government on 30 December 2007, after an agreement to abolish the monarchy following the election, and to have a system of partial proportional representation in the election. Following power-sharing discussions that lasted several months, Dahal was elected as Prime Minister by the Constituent Assembly on 15 August 2008, and he was sworn in as Prime Minister on 18 August 2008.

The decade-long war ultimately led the Maoists to Nepal's parliament. After winning a remarkable majority in the Constitutional Assembly elections, Dahal was nominated for the Prime Ministership by the party. In the April 2008 Constituent Assembly election, he was elected from Kathmandu constituency-10, winning by a large margin, and receiving nearly twice as many votes as his nearest rival, the candidate of the Nepali Congress. He also won overwhelmingly in Rolpa constituency-2, receiving 34,230 votes against 6,029 for Shanta Kumar Oli of the Communist Party of Nepal (Unified Marxist-Leninist), CPN(UML). With the CPN(M) appearing to have won the election, Dahal pledged that the party would work together with other parties in crafting the new constitution, and he assured the international community, particularly India and China, that the party wanted good relations and co-operation. He also said that the party had expressed its commitment to multi-party democracy through the election.

Second premiership 

In August 2016 Pushpa Kamal Dahal was elected for a second stint as Prime Minister of Nepal. Dahal became the 24th prime minister since Nepal's adoption of multi-party democracy in 1990 and the eighth since the abolition of the monarchy in 2008. He resigned from the post of Prime Minister on 24 May 2017 and was succeeded by Sher Bahadur Deuba of the Nepali Congress in June.

Third premiership 

Pushpa Kamal Dahal was appointed prime minister for the third time on 25 December 2022, following the 2022 Nepalese general election. He won the vote of confidence in the House on 10 January 2023 after 268 out of the present 270 members voted in favor of him.

Personal life 
Pushpa Kamal Dahal married Sita Poudel when he was fifteen. They have three daughters (including Renu Dahal) and a son.

Publications

References

External links 

 

|-

|-

|-

|-

1954 births
2008 in Nepal
21st-century prime ministers of Nepal
Bahun
Communist Party of Nepal (Fourth Convention) politicians
Communist Party of Nepal (Mashal) politicians
Living people
Maoist theorists
Members of the 1st Nepalese Constituent Assembly
Members of the 2nd Nepalese Constituent Assembly
Nepal Communist Party (NCP) politicians
Nepal MPs 2017–2022
Nepal MPs 2022–present
Nepalese political party founders
Nepalese revolutionaries
People from Chitwan District
People from Kaski District
People of the Nepalese Civil War
Prime ministers of Nepal